The Hegel Society of Great Britain (HSGB) is an English-speaking forum for scholars and students interested in the writings of the philosopher GWF Hegel (1770–1831). Such scholastic interest may extend to Hegel's predecessors, contemporaries, followers and critics.

The HSGB was founded in 1979, has over 200 members, and holds an annual conference. Its bi-annual journal is the Hegel Bulletin, published by Cambridge University Press.

See also
 Hegel Society of America

References

External links
 Hegel Society of Great Britain website

Philosophical societies in the United Kingdom
Learned societies of the United Kingdom
Organizations established in 1979
1979 establishments in the United Kingdom
Georg Wilhelm Friedrich Hegel